Jacob Steinberg (September 1, 1887– June 22, 1947) was a major Ukrainian-born poet in Mandatory Palestine.

Biography
Jacob Steinberg was born in Bila Tserkva, but ran off to Odessa when he was 14, joining Bialik and other Jewish intellectuals of the Hebrew literary circle there.  In 1903 Steinberg moved to Warsaw, and participated in Peretz's  literary circle. In 1910 he moved to Switzerland, studying in university at Bern and Lucerne. He soon returned to Warsaw. During those years, he published works in Hebrew and Yiddish, especially in the Yiddish newspaper "Der Fraind". While still in Europe, he married and divorced a dentist with whom he had one son.

In 1914, Steinberg immigrated to Palestine, and wrote exclusively in Hebrew ever since.  In 1929, he married Liza Arlosoroff, a musician, and sister of Haim Arlosoroff, and later edited Haim Arlosoroff's writings.

He remained in Tel Aviv for the rest of his life, though he briefly lived in Berlin in the 1920s. He received the Bialik Prize in 1937.

Literary style
He defied trends in two significant ways: his poetry was individualistic rather than nationalistic, and he wrote in the Ashkenazic dialect rather than the Sephardic dialect, which became the accepted norm of Israeli Hebrew. His two most famous poems are "Not an enclosed Garden" and "Confession".

See also
Israeli literature

References

Bibliography

External links
 

1887 births
1947 deaths
Ukrainian Ashkenazi Jews
People of Ukrainian-Jewish descent
Ashkenazi Jews in Mandatory Palestine
Jewish poets
Ukrainian poets
Yiddish-language playwrights
20th-century poets
20th-century dramatists and playwrights
Burials at Trumpeldor Cemetery
Emigrants from the Russian Empire to the Ottoman Empire